Ahmed Refaat was an Egyptian football coach and former player, previously the head coach of Zamalek SC.

He died on 13 December 2017.

References

1942 births
2017 deaths
Egyptian football managers
Egyptian footballers
Zamalek SC managers
Syria national football team managers
Malkiya Club managers
Association football defenders
Association football midfielders
African Games bronze medalists for Egypt
Footballers at the 1973 All-Africa Games
African Games medalists in football